Methanesulfonyl fluoride (MSF) has long been known to be a potent inhibitor of acetylcholinesterase (AChE), the enzyme that regulates acetylcholine, an important neurotransmitter in both the central and peripheral nervous systems.

Technical and physical properties
MSF is a clear, colorless to yellowish hygroscopic liquid (attracts and holds water by absorption or adsorption). It is corrosive and highly toxic. It is an oxydiaphoric inhibitor (acid-transferring inhibitor) of the enzyme acetylcholinesterase. MSF, which is a liquid at room temperature, has a vapor pressure of 19.2 mmHg, slightly more volatile than water which has a vapor pressure of 18.8 mmHg at 21 °C.  This vapor has an LCt50 (lethal concentration, 50% death rate in a given time) in rats of between 4 and 5 parts per million (ppm) during one hour of exposure or between 1 and 1.2 ppm during 7 hours of exposure. MSF produced no subtle biological effects from direct action of MSF independent of its ability to inhibit cholinesterase.  Repeated exposures to 1/10 of the LCt50 did not produce overt systemic toxicity or significant pathology.  MSF can also cause severe skin burns and serious eye damage, if contact is made. It is a lachrymator and its vapor causes tears in eyes.

Methanesulfonyl fluoride has a pungent odor. It undergoes decomposition on heating to liberate additional toxic fumes of fluorides and sulfur oxides (SOx).

Synthesis
A typical synthesis is to treat methanesulfonyl chloride with potassium fluoride or potassium bifluoride in water and then steam distill the product out.

Therapeutic study
Animal studies have shown that MSF-induced inhibition of AChE is highly selective for the brain when it is studied in vivo.  MSF is an irreversible inhibitor of AChE and its inhibition of AChE is only overcome by de novo synthesis of new AChE in each tissue.  The recovery of AChE activity in the brain is less than one-tenth as rapid as AChE recovery in the gastrointestinal system, allowing very high accumulated AChE inhibition in the brain with clinically insignificant AChE inhibition in peripheral tissues. The high selectivity of MSF for inhibition in the brain has suggested that it could be used as a treatment for dementia of the Alzheimer type, that it is effective in reducing the persistent cognitive deficit after stroke, and it is highly effective in reducing normal age-related memory impairment, making aged rats perform as well as younger rats.

Methanesulfonyl fluoride has been tested successfully in three human clinical trials as a treatment for Alzheimer's dementia.  Two Phase I clinical trials testing for safety of MSF in humans at the doses proposed for treating dementia have shown that it is well tolerated and relatively free of the side effects of nausea, vomiting, and diarrhea that are produced by the current cholinesterase inhibitors used for the treatment of Alzheimer's dementia. Furthermore, a Phase II, clinical trial testing both the safety and the efficacy of MSF found that it was well tolerated in the aged patients, and it was highly effective in reducing the symptoms of Alzheimer's dementia. US Patent has been issued for the use of MSF for the treatment of dementia.

References 

Sulfonyl halides
Acetylcholinesterase inhibitors